Friedrich Ostermann (21 June 1932 – 22 October 2018) was an Auxiliary Bishop of the Roman Catholic Diocese of Münster.

Ostermann was ordained on 11 February 1958. After an initial temporary appointment in Bockum-Hövel he became a Chaplain in Emsdetten, and then a parish priest in Rheine (Sacred Heart) in 1969 and in 1975 a Dean in the Office of the Rhine Deanery.

Pope John Paul II appointed him as Titular Bishop of Dolia and Auxiliary Bishop of Münster (Suffragan Bishop of Warendorf in the diocese of Münster). On 13 September 1981, Ostermann was ordained as a bishop by Bishop Dr. Reinhard Lettmann; co-consecrators were Hermann Josef Spital (Bishop of Trier), and  Alfons Demming (Auxiliary Bishop of Münster). In 1981 Ostermann was appointed a Canon Residentiary of Münster Cathedral and Head of the Agency of Missions, Development and Freedom of the Bishops' General Vicarage at Münster. Since 2003 he has been the Dean of the Cathedral of St Paul in Münster.

From 2001 – 2006, Ostermann was the Chairman of the Journalism Commission of the German Bishops' Conference.

On his 75th birthday he tendered his resignation to Pope Benedict XVI on 21 June 2007 which was accepted on 18 July that year.

Dedication 

„Eure Güte werde allen Menschen bekannt“, for Choir (SATB). Text: Phil 4,5. Melodie and setting: Ludger Stühlmeyer. „Weihbischof Friedrich Ostermann zum diamantenen Priesterjubiläum“. Bishop Friedrich Ostermann for his diamond jubilee on 25 February 2018.

References

External links 

 Information about Friedrich Ostermann on the Diocese of Münster site
 

1932 births
2018 deaths
People from Münster
German Roman Catholic titular bishops
20th-century German Roman Catholic bishops
21st-century German Roman Catholic bishops
Auxiliary bishops
20th-century German Roman Catholic priests